Jean-Pierre Filiu (born in Paris, 1961) is a French professor of Middle East studies at Sciences Po, Paris School of International Affairs, an orientalist and an arabist.

Life and career 
Before joining Sciences Po in 2006, Jean-Pierre Filiu was a career-diplomat who served as a junior officer in Jordan and the US, before becoming the French Deputy Chief of Mission (DCM) in Syria (1996–99) and in Tunisia (2002-2006). Filiu was also diplomatic adviser to the French minister of Interior (1990–91), the minister of Defense (1991–93) and the Prime Minister (2000-2002). He was one of the ten independent experts that President François Hollande designated to contribute to the 2013 White Book for National Defense and Security.

Jean-Pierre Filiu authored or co-authored some twenty books, including "The Arab Revolution, ten lessons from the democratic uprising",. He later authored "Gaza, a history" (2014, Palestine Book Award) and "From Deep State to Islamic State, the Arab counter-revolution and its jihadi legacy" (2015), "Revisiting the Arab uprisings, the politics of a revolutionary moment" (2018).

His previous research focused on the multi-faceted adaptation of Islam to globalized modernity. He described the conflicting dialectics between local and global jihad. And he highlighted how radical movements try to "modernize" traditional concepts, giving them a new meaning previously unknown in Islam, for instance in the case of the caliphate. His "Apocalypse in Islam" was awarded the main prize (Augustin-Thierry) by the Rendez-vous de l'Histoire, held every October in the city of Blois.

He has been visiting professor at the Columbia University (New York City, NY) and Georgetown University, invited as a guest speaker to American universities, Harvard Kennedy School (Cambridge, MA) and the James Baker Institute (Houston, TX), as well as think tanks.:

Other activities 
Filiu has been interviewed by Christiane Amanpour, by BBC/The World  and has been a guest to the English-speaking branch of France 24. He also published five graphic novels and wrote the lyrics of two songs, one about the conflict of the Gaza strip and the latter about the Syrian civil war.

References

1961 births
Living people
Scientists from Paris
French political scientists
20th-century French historians
21st-century French historians
Academic staff of Sciences Po
Sciences Po alumni
French scholars of Islam
Islamic eschatology
Islam and politics
Works about Islamism
Jihad